Yankho Kamwendo (born 1 November 1978) is a Swedish TV personality and actor.

Kamwendo is best known for his role as Lennart in the TV show Leende guldbruna ögon  and hosting popular children's television shows Bolibompa and TV-skeppet.  Kamwendo has also been featured in the popular live sing-along television show Allsång på Skansen.
He has toured extensively with national theatre company Riksteatern, performing the play Elddop. Kamwendo has also initiated a documentary about Malawian children who became orphans after losing their parents to HIV.

Personal life
Yankho Kamwendo's father was born in Malawi and his mother hails from Sweden. Kamwendo lives in Hammarbyhöjden, Stockholm.
He is an alpine skiing enthusiast  and has been involved with missionary aid work in Africa.

References

External links 

1978 births
Living people
Swedish television hosts
Swedish Christians
Swedish male television actors
Swedish male stage actors
21st-century Swedish male actors
People from Uppsala
Swedish people of Malawian descent